Fast Life is a 1932 American Pre-Code romantic comedy film starring William Haines and Madge Evans, directed by Harry A. Pollard and is based upon the story Let's Go by E.J. Rath.

Plot
Two people leave the US Navy after having served ten years as a sailor. Sandy is one of them and later invents a carburetor that should increase the speed that powered boats will run. When testing it, he accidentally sinks a boat and has to pay for it. Now he is broke and enters a boat contest. To win, he has to invent the fastest boat in the world.

Cast (in credits order)
William Haines as Sandy
Madge Evans as Shirley
Conrad Nagel as Burton
Arthur Byron as Jameson
Cliff Edwards as Bumpy
Warburton Gamble as Halstead
Kenneth Thomson as Mr Williams
Albert Gran as Van Vrinken
Pete Smith as Race Announcer

External links
 
 

1932 films
1932 romantic comedy films
American black-and-white films
American romantic comedy films
Boat racing films
Films directed by Harry A. Pollard
Metro-Goldwyn-Mayer films
1930s English-language films
1930s American films